Mount Güllük-Termessos National Park, established on November 3, 1970, is a national park in southern Turkey. It is located in the Döşemealtı-Korkuteli districts of Antalya Province.

It takes its name from the mountain Güllük Dagi (Mount Güllük), which was known in prehistory as Solymus and the ancient city of Termessos. Hence the area may be the homeland of an ancient people known as the Solymoi and one of their towns, Solyma. Mount Solymus may also be the basis of the name of an eponymous Greek mythological figure.

See also
Termessos

References

National parks of Turkey
Geography of Antalya Province
Landforms of Antalya Province
Tourist attractions in Antalya Province
Döşemealtı District
Korkuteli District
1970 establishments in Turkey
Protected areas established in 1970
World Heritage Tentative List for Turkey
Important Bird Areas of Turkey